Yevgeni Nikolayevich Goshev (born 17 June 1997) is a Russian football player who plays for FC Orenburg.

Club career
He played his first game for the main squad of FC Rostov on 24 September 2015 in a Russian Cup game against FC Tosno.

He made his Russian Football National League debut for FC Shinnik Yaroslavl on 1 September 2018 in a game against FC Nizhny Novgorod.

Goshev made his Russian Premier League debut for FC Orenburg on 16 July 2022 against PFC Krylia Sovetov Samara.

International career

Youth
Goshev made his debut for Russia U-19 on 10 October 2015 in a friendly match against Greece U-19.

Career statistics

References

External links
 

1997 births
Footballers from Voronezh
Living people
Russian footballers
Russia youth international footballers
Russia under-21 international footballers
Association football goalkeepers
FC Rostov players
FC Shinnik Yaroslavl players
FC Orenburg players
Russian First League players
Russian Second League players
Russian Premier League players